Sonny Wool (2008–2020) was a sheep from the North Island of New Zealand. Born in Dannevirke circa 2008, he was named after All Black Sonny Bill Williams. He became famous after his feeding behaviour was used to correctly predict the winner of each of the New Zealand national rugby union team's matches at the 2011 Rugby World Cup. His role at the 2011 Rugby World Cup was compared to that of Paul the Octopus at the 2010 FIFA World Cup.

Sonny Wool’s owner was Beverley Dowling. His agent was Dan Boyd, who also designed the sheep’s prediction process. The prediction process was designed so that Sonny Wool was presented with two boxes containing feed in the form of hay, each box marked on the outside with the flag of a national rugby union team in a forthcoming match. His choice of which hay to eat first was interpreted as indicating his prediction of a win for the country whose flag was on that box. Selections by the sheep were correct in all of New Zealand’s matches in the 2011 Rugby World Cup, though predictions for the other three quarter-finals turned out to be incorrect.

Sonny Wool had his own website, Facebook and Twitter accounts. He was reported to be under 24-hour security watch after receiving death threats.

Personality
According to Dan Boyd, as a lamb, Sonny Wool predicted when it was going to rain. His manager described him as "a bit socially inept" who prefers the company of humans and has "got a few fetishes for things – one is light at night and he really likes rugby balls".

Results

2011 Rugby World Cup

See also
Sheep
Similar oracles
Shrek (sheep)

References

External links
 Website

Oracular animals
2011 Rugby World Cup
New Zealand at the 2011 Rugby World Cup
Sheep farming in New Zealand
Individual sheep
Dannevirke
2008 animal births
Individual animals in New Zealand